Mahitha Mohan is an Indian cyclist who has been national champion in multiple road, track, and mountain bike events. At the 2010 South Asian Games, she was the 50 km Mass Start gold medal winner. She was named India's best cyclist in 2010.

Biography
Mahitha Mohan started competitive cycling in 2002, at the age of 14, following her elder brother Santhanu into the sport. With the family living in Thodupuzha, a small town in Kerala, India, the nearest cycling track for training was located at Trivandrum, a more than 5-hour drive away.

Palmarès

2002

National Track Cycling Championship
 Time Trial (Girls under 14)
 Individual pursuit (Girls under 14)
2003

National Mountain Bike Cycling Championship
 Mass Start (Girls under 16)
 Mass Start (Girls under 18)
 Time Trial (Girls under 16)

National Track Cycling Championship
 Team pursuit (Girls under 18)
 Team time trial (Girls under 18)
 Individual pursuit (Girls under 16)
2004

National Mountain Bike Cycling Championship
 Mass Start (Girls under 16)
 Mass Start (Girls under 18)
 Time Trial (Girls under 16)

National Track Cycling Championship
 Team pursuit (Girls under 18)
 Team time trial (Girls under 18)
2005

National Mountain Bike Cycling Championship
 Mass Start (Girls under 18)
 Time Trial (Girls under 18)
2006

National Track Cycling Championship (at Patiyala)
 Olympic Sprint (Girls under 19)
 Mass Start (Girls under 19)
 Points race (Girls under 19)
 Team pursuit (Girls under 19)
 Team time trial (Girls under 19)

National Track Cycling Championship (at Bijapur)
 Mass Start (Girls under 19)
 Points race (Girls under 19)
 Olympic Sprint (Girls under 19)
 Team time trial (Girls under 19)
 Points race (Women)
 Team pursuit (Girls under 19)

National Road Cycling Championship
 Mass Start (Girls under 19)
 Time Trial (Girls under 19)
 Team time trial (Women)

All India Inter University Cycling Championship
 Mass Start
 Time Trial
2007

National Mountain Bike Cycling Championship
 Mass Start (Girls under 19)

National Games of India
 Sprint
 Olympic Team Sprint

National Track Cycling Championship
 Points race (Women)
 Points race (Girls under 19)
 Scratch race (Girls under 19)
 Time Trial (Girls under 19)
 Olympic Team Sprint (Women)
 Sprint (Women)
 Time Trial (Women)
 Team pursuit (Women)
 Team time trial (Women)

National Road Cycling Championship
 Mass Start (Girls under 19)
 Team time trial (Women)
 Time Trial (Women)
2008

All India Inter University Cycling Championship
 Mass Start (Women)
 Time Trial (Women)
 Team pursuit (Women)
 Team time trial (Women)

National Road Cycling Championship
 Kriterium (Women) 
 Mass Start (Women)
 Team time trial (Women)
2009

National Track Cycling Championship
 Points race (Women)
 Time Trial (Women)
 Olympic Sprint (Women)
 Sprint (Women)
 Team pursuit (Women)
 Team time trial (Women)

All India Inter University Cycling Championship
 Mass Start (Women)
 Time Trial (Women)
 Team time trial (Women)
 Team pursuit
2010

South Asian Games
 Mass Start 50 km
 Team time trial

References

Road racing cyclists
Indian track cyclists
Indian mountain bikers
Indian female cyclists
Cyclists at the 2010 Commonwealth Games
Living people
Cyclists at the 2014 Commonwealth Games
Commonwealth Games competitors for India
1988 births
Cyclists at the 2010 Asian Games
Cyclists at the 2014 Asian Games
Sportswomen from Kerala
People from Idukki district
21st-century Indian women
21st-century Indian people
Place of birth missing (living people)
South Asian Games gold medalists for India
Asian Games competitors for India
South Asian Games medalists in cycling